Nationality words link to articles with information on the nation's poetry or literature (for instance, Irish or France).

Events
 January 20 — Maya Angelou reads "On the Pulse of Morning" at the inauguration of President Bill Clinton.
 March 31–April 3 — Writing from the New Coast: First Festival of Poetry held at the State University of New York at Buffalo. Many influential younger poets attend the conference. The final, two-volume issue of o•blék magazine this year will contain writing presented at the conference.
 December 8 — Start of the University of Buffalo POETICS listserv, informally and variously known as UBPOETICS or the POETICS list, one of the oldest and most widely known mailing lists devoted to the discussion of contemporary North American poetry and poetics. In the early days of the list, membership, list discussions and even the existence of the list itself were kept private, and members were required not to discuss the contents of list postings or the list itself with "outsiders." People who wished to join the list were asked to provide a short "personal statement" before being approved.
 T. S. Eliot Prize created.
 Reality television contest Million's Poet (Arabic: شاعر المليون) is launched in the United Arab Emirates.
 Bound by Honor, a film directed by Taylor Hackford, based on the life of poet Jimmy Santiago Baca, who co-wrote the screenplay, is released.
 Poetic Justice, a film directed by John Singleton, features Maya Angelou's poetry, and she appears as Aunt June.
 Poesia sempre, is created by the National Library of Brazil to promote poetry both from that nation and from beyond its borders and provide a forum for debate on poetry
 A new Yiddish monthly journal, Di yidishe gas ("The Jewish Street"), edited by Aron Vergelis, appears in Moscow. It is the first since the Sovetish heymland ("Soviet Homeland") became defunct.
 American literary magazine o•blék (pronounced "oblique"), founded in 1987 by Peter Gizzi who co-edited it with Connell McGrath, stopped publishing.

Works published in English
Listed by nation where the work was first published and again by the poet's native land, if different; substantially revised works listed separately:

Australia
 Jennifer Maiden, Acoustic Shadow, Penguin
 Philip Salom: Feeding the Ghost, Penguin, 
 John Tranter:
 Under Berlin, University of Queensland Press
 The Floor of Heaven, HarperCollins/Angus & Robertson
 Chris Wallace-Crabbe, Rungs of Time, Oxford University Press

Canada
 George Bowering:
 The Moustache: Remembering Greg Curnoe
 George Bowering Selected: Poems 1961–1992
 Marilyn Bowering, Love as It Is
 Leonard Cohen, Stranger Music: Selected Poems and Songs, selected from works written between 1956 and 1992
 Sheree Fitch, In This House Are Many Women
 Judith Fitzgerald:
 Walkin' Wounded, including a cycle of baseball poems
 "Habit of Blues", a prose poem meditating on the fate of the late novelist Juan Butler.
 Bryan Gooch and Maureen Niwa, editors, The Emergence of the Muse: Major Canadian Poets from Crawford to Pratt, Toronto: Oxford University Press (scholarship)
 Irving Layton,  Fornalutx
 Dennis Lee, Riffs London, Ont.: Brick Books.
 Gwendolyn MacEwen:
 Atwood, Margaret and Barry Callaghan, eds. The Poetry of Gwendolyn MacEwen: The Early Years (Volume One). Toronto: Exile Editions. 
 Atwood, Margaret and Barry Callaghan, eds. The Poetry of Gwendolyn MacEwen: The Later Years (Volume Two). Toronto: Exile Editions. 
 A. F. Moritz, The Ruined Cottage
 bp Nichol:
 Truth: A Book of Fictions
 First Screening
 Hernert Rosengarten and Amanda Goldrick-Jones, editors, Broadview Anthology of Poetry, anthology of American, British and Canadian poetry; 
 Raymond Souster, Old Bank Notes. Ottawa: Oberon.
 Raymond Souster, Riding the Long Black Horse, Ottawa: Oberon.

India, in English
 Sudeep Sen, Parallel ( Poetry in English ), with compact disc/audio cassette; Edinburgh: The Scottish Poetry Library
 Arundhathi Subramaniam, editor, In Their Own Voice: The Penguin Anthology of Contemporary Indian Women Poets, anthology; New Delhi: Penguin, .
 Makarand Paranjape, editor, Indian Poetry in English, Madras: Macmillan India Ltd.

Ireland
 Fergus Allen, The Brown Parrots of Providencia, including "Elegy for Faustina" and "The Fall", Faber and Faber, Irish poet published in the United Kingdom
 Pat Boran, Familiar Things, publisher: Dedalus
 Ciaran Carson, First Language, including "Ovid: Metamorphoses, V, 529–550" and "Bagpipe Music", Oldcastle: The Gallery Press, 
 Michael D. Higgins, The Season of Fire
 Medbh McGuckian, The Flower Master and Other Poems, including "The Seed-picture", "Gateposts" and "The Flower Master", Oldcastle: The Gallery Press
 Martin Mooney, Grub, including "Anna Akhmatova's Funeral", Belfast: The Blackstaff Press
 W. R. Rodgers, Poems, including "Lent", "The Net" and "Stormy Night", Oldcastle: The Gallery Press

New Zealand
 Fleur Adcock (New Zealand poet who moved to England in 1963), Mary Magdalene and the Birds: Mezzo-soprano and Clarinet, by Dorothy Buchanan, with words by Fleur Adcock, Wellington: Waiteata Press
 Andrew Johnston, Sol How to Talk, winner of the 1994 New Zealand Book Award for Poetry and the 1994 Jessie Mackay Best First Book Award
 Cilla McQueen, Crïk'ey: New and Selected Poems
 W. H. Oliver, Bodily Presence: Words, Paintings, co-author: Anne Munz; Wellington: BlackBerry Press, New Zealand
 Keith Sinclair, Moontalk
 Ian Wedde, The Drummer

United Kingdom
 Fleur Adcock (New Zealand poet who moved to England in 1963), Mary Magdalene and the Birds: Mezzo-soprano and Clarinet, by Dorothy Buchanan, with words by Fleur Adcock, Wellington: Waiteata Press
 Fergus Allen, The Brown Parrots of Providencia, including "Elegy for Faustina" and "The Fall", Faber and Faber, Irish poet published in the United Kingdom
 Moniza Alvi, The Country at my Shoulder
 Simon Armitage, Book of Matches
 Barbara Bleiman editor, Five Modern Poets: Fleur Adcock, U. A. Fanthorpe, Tony Harrison, Anne Stevenson, Derek Walcott, Harlow, England: Longman
 Ciarán Carson: First Language: Poems, Gallery Books, Wake Forest University Press, Irish poet published in the United Kingdom
 Gillian Clarke, The King of Britain's Daughter
 Blaga Dimitrova, Bulgaria's popular vice president, The Last Rock Eagle, a translation of several of her poems
 Carol Ann Duffy, Mean Time, Anvil Press Poetry
 Douglas Dunn, Dante's Drum-Kit
 Paul Durcan, A Snail in my Prime
 D. J. Enright, Old Men and Comets
 James Fenton, Out of Danger
 Roy Fuller, Last Poems
 W. S. Graham, Aimed at Nobody (posthumous)
 Thom Gunn, Collected Poems
 Tony Harrison, Black Daisies for the Bride
 Seamus Heaney:
 Keeping Going, Bow and Arrow Press
 Translator: The Midnight Verdict: Translations from the Irish of Brian Merriman and from the Metamorphoses of Ovid,  Gallery Press
 John Heath-Stubbs, Sweet-Apple Earth
 Jackie Kay, Other Lovers
 James Kirkup, Blue Bamboo
 Jamie McKendrick, The Kiosk on the Brink
 E. A. Markham, Letter from Ulster and the Hugo Poems
 Sean O'Brien, A Rarity (Carnivorous Arpeggio)
 Tom Rawling, The Names of the Sea-Trout
 Carol Rumens, Thinking of Skins
 Labi Siffre, Nigger
 R. S. Thomas, Collected Poems, 1945–1990

Criticism, scholarship and biography in the United Kingdom
 Elmer Andrews, editor, The Poetry of Seamus Heaney, 
 Thomas N. Corns, editor, Cambridge Companion to English Poetry, Donne to Marvell, Cambridge: Cambridge University Press
 Michael Parker, Seamus Heaney: The Making of the Poet,

United States
 Ai, Greed
 A.R. Ammons, Garbage, a book-length poem about American trash and its implications, winner of the National Book Award for Poetry this year and the 1994 Bobbitt National Prize for Poetry
 Jared Carter, After the Rain, winner of the Poets' Prize for 1994
 Geoffrey Dearmer, A Pilgrim's Song: Selected Poems
 Mark Doty,  My Alexandria
 Petya Dubarova, Here I Am, in Perfect Leaf Today (posthumous), translated from Bulgarian to English by Don D. Wilson
 Jerry Estrin, Rome, A Mobile Home
 Margaret Gibson, The Vigil
 Donald Hall, Life Work, memoir
 John Hollander:
 Selected Poetry
 Tesserae and Other Poems
 Daniel Halpern, editor, The Inferno by Dante, 21 living American poets wrote their versions of the cantos
 Meto Jovanovski, Faceless Men and Other Macedonian Stories, translated from Macedonian to English by Charles Simic in collaboration with Milne Holton and Jeffrey Folks.
 Susan Ludvigson, Everything Winged Must Be Dreaming
 Jack Marshall, Sesame
 W. S. Merwin:
 The Second Four Books of Poems, Port Townsend, Washington: Copper Canyon Press
 W. S. Merwin, Travels: Poems, New York: Knopf
 Lorine Niedecker and Louis Zukofsky, Niedecker and the Correspondence with Zukofsky 1931–1970, edited by Jenny Penberthy (Cambridge University Press)
 Ed Ochester & Peter Oresick, Pittsburgh Book of Contemporary American Poetry (University of Pittsburgh Press)
 Jim Powell, translator, Sappho: A Garland, new translations of the poems and fragments of the 6th-century BC poet
 Lawrence Raab, What We Don't Know About Each Other
 Adrienne Rich, Collected Early Poems, 1950–1970
 David Rosenberg, translator, The Lost Book of Paradise, a verse translation of Genesis
 Sherod Santos, The City of Women, a sequence of poems and prose
 Sappho, Sappho: A Garland, new translations of the poems and fragments, translated by Jim Powell
 James Schuyler, Collected Poems
 Frederick Seidel, My Tokyo
 Charles Simic, translator, The Horse Has Six Legs: An Anthology of Serbian Poetry, from Serbian into English, including Serbian poets Ivan V. Lalić, Vasko Popa, Momčilo Nastasijević, and Nina Zivancevic.
 Sande Stojcevski, A Gate in the Cloud, translated by David Bowen and others from Macedonian to English, with more than 50 of the poet's lyrics.
 Mark Strand, Dark Harbor, Canadian native living in and published in the United States
 Luci Tapahonso, Saanii Dahataal
 Rosmarie Waldrop, Lawn of the Excluded Middle (Tender Buttons)
 Rosanna Warren, Stained Glass
 Eliot Weinberger, editor, American Poetry Since 1950: Innovators and Outsiders (Marsilio Publishers)

Criticism, scholarship and biography in the United States
 Donald Hall, Life Work, a memoir
 Jay Parini, editor, The Columbia History of American Poetry
 Alex Preminger, and T. V. F. Brogan, editors, The New Princeton Encyclopedia of Poetry and Poetics, Princeton, New Jersey: Princeton University Press
 Adrienne Rich, What Is Found There: Notebooks on Poetry and Politics
 Delmore Schwartz and James Laughlin, Selected Letters, correspondence between the poet and his publisher

Anthologies in the United States
 Don Burness, editor, Echoes of the Sunbird: An Anthology of Contemporary African Poetry, Athens: Ohio University Center for International Studies
 John Hollander, editor, American Poetry, the Nineteenth Century, two volumes (Library of America)
 Garrett Hongo, editor, The Open Boat: Poems from Asian America, New York: Doubleday

Poets included in The Best American Poetry 1993
Poems from these 75 poets were in The Best American Poetry 1993, edited by David Lehman, guest editor Louise Glück:

A. R. Ammons
John Ashbery
Michael Atkinson
Stephen Berg
Sophie Cabot Black
Stephanie Brown
Charles Bukowski
Hayden Carruth
Tom Clark
Killarney Clary
Marc Cohen
Billy Collins
Peter Cooley
Carolyn Creedon
Barbara Cully

Carl Dennis
Tim Dlugos
Stephen Dobyns
Denise Duhamel
Stephen Dunn
Roger Fanning
Alice B. Fogel
Tess Gallagher
Albert Goldbarth
Jorie Graham
Allen Grossman
Thom Gunn
Donald Hall
Mark Halliday
Daniel Halpern

Paul Hoover
David Ignatow
Josephine Jacobsen
Mark Jarman
Rodney Jones
Donald Justice
Brigit Pegeen Kelly
Robert Kelly
Jane Kenyon
Pamela Kircher
Kenneth Koch
Phyllis Koestenbaum
Stanley Kunitz
Denise Levertov
Lisa Lewis

Thomas Lux
Elizabeth Macklin
Tom Mandel
James McMichael
Sandra McPherson
W.S. Merwin
Susan Mitchell
A. F. Moritz
Mary Oliver
Ron Padgett
Michael Palmer
Lucia Maria Perillo
Wang Ping
Lawrence Raab
Adrienne Rich

Laura Riding
Gjertrud Schnackenberg
Hugh Seidman
Charles Simic
Louis Simpsom
Gary Snyder
Gerald Stern
Ruth Stone
Mark Strand
James Tate
John Updike
Ellen Bryant Voigt
Susan Wheeler
C. K. Williams
Dean Young

Works published in other languages
Listed by nation where the work was first published and again by the poet's native land, if different; substantially revised works listed separately:

Denmark
 Kirsten Hammann, Jeg er så træt af min krop (Mellem tænderne), publisher: Gyldendal; Denmark
Pia Tafdrup, Krystalskoven
Henrik Nordbrandt, Støvets tyngde
Thorkild Bjørnvig, Siv vand og måne
Kirsten Hammann, Vera Vinkelvir, a cross between a prose poem and a novel

French language

Canada
 Claude Beausoleil, L'Usage du temps
 Louise Dupré, Noir déjà
 Madeleine Gagnon, La Terre est remplie de langage
 Serge-Patrice Thibodeau, Le Cycle de Prague

France
 Olivier Barbarant, Douze lettres d'amore au soldat inconnu, publisher: Editions Champ Vallon; 
 Yves Bonnefoy:
 La vie errante
 Une autre époque de l'écriture
 Claude Esteban, Sept jours d'hier, Fourbis
 Abdellatif Laabi, L'Étreinte du monde; Paris; Moroccan author writing in French and published in France
 Yves Leclair, L'or du commun

Germany
 Christoph Buchwald, general editor, and Robert Gernhardt, guest editor, Jahrbuch der Lyrik 9 ("Poetry Yearbook 9"), publisher: Luchterhand; anthology
 Heinz Czechowski, Nachtspur
 Wulf Kirsten, Stimmenschotter
 Richard Wagner, Heisse Maroni

Hebrew
 Mordechai Geldman, A'yin ("Eye")
 Israel Eliraz, Pe Karu'a ("A Torn Mouth")
 Tamir Greenberg, Dyokan Atzmi Im Qvant veHatul Met ("Self Portrait with Quantum and Dead Cat")
 Zvika Shternfeld, Hamarkiza miGovari ("The Marquise of Govari")
 Shimon Shloush, Tola Havui shel Asham ("A Hidden Worm of Guilt")

India
Listed in alphabetical order by first name:
 Gulzar, Chand Pukhraj Ka; Urdu-language
 K. Satchidanandan, Ente Satchidanandan Kavitakal, selected poems; Malayalam-language
 Kanaka Ha Ma, Holebagilu, Sagara, Karnataka: Akshara Prakashana; Kannada language
 Kunwar Narain, Koee Doosra Naheen, New Delhi: Rajkamal Prakashan, ; Hindi-language
 Mallika Sengupta, Ardheke Prithivi, Kolkata: Ananda Publishers; Bengali-language
 Manushya Puthiran, En Padukai araiyil yaroo olithirukirargal, Chennai: South Asian Books, Tamil language
 Nilmani Phookan, editor, Aranyar Gan, an anthology of Indian tribal love poems; Guwahati, Assam: Students' Store, Assamese-language
 Prabodh Parikh, Kaunsman ("Between Parentheses/In Brackets"), winner of several awards, including Best Poetry Collection of 1993-94 from the Gujarat Sahitya Akademi and the G.F. Saraf Award for Best Gujarati Book in 1992–1995; Mumbai: R.R. Sheth Publishers; Gujarati-language

Poland
 Ewa Lipska, Wakacje mizantropa. Utwory wybrane ("Misanthrope Holidays: Selected Work"), Kraków: Wydawnictwo literackie
 Jarosław Marek Rymkiewicz, Moje dzielo posmiertne ("My Posthumous Works") Kraków: Znak
 Wisława Szymborska: Koniec i początek ("The End and the Beginning")
 Jan Twardowski:
 Kasztan dla milionera: Wiersze dla dzieci, Warsaw: Nasza Księgarnia
 Krzyżyk na drogę ("Cross the Road"), Kraków: Znak

Portuguese language

Portugal
 Joaquim Manuel Magalhães, A poeira levada pelo vento

Brazil
 Waly Salamão, Armarinho da miudezas, which reflects native Bahian traditions
 Sebastião Uchoa Leite, published a poetry book
 Felipe Fortuna published a poetry book
 Adão Ventura, Texturaafro,

Serbia

 Miodrag Pavlović:
 Knjiga horizonta ("The Book of Horizon")
 Nebo v pećini ("The Sky in the Rocks")
 Ogledi o narodnoj i staros srpskoj poeziji ("A Treatise on Folk and Old Serbian Poetry"), scholarship
 Dejan Stojanović, Krugovanje: 1978–1987 ("Circling"), first edition, Narodna knjiga–Alfa, Beograd

Spain
 Matilde Camus, Amor dorado ("Golden Love")
 Ángel González, Poemas
 Xavier Sabater, editor, Poesía experimental 93, a visual poetry anthology; Barcelona: Sedicions

Sweden
 Jesper Svenbro:
 Blått ("Blue")
 Samisk Apollon och andra dikter ("The Sami Apollo and Other Poems")
 Henrik Nilsson, Utan skor

Yiddish
 Yisroel Khaym Biletski, Uri Tsvi Grinberg der yidish-dikhter ("Uri Tsvi Grinberg: The Yiddish Poet") biography on the poet

Other
 Lindita Arapi, Kufomë lulesh, Albania
 Blaga Dimitrova, Bulgaria's popular vice president, Noshten dnevnik ("Night Diary"), 70 poems written from 1989 to 1992
 Lo Fu (Luo Fu), Hidden Title Poems, Chinese (Taiwan)
 Cathal Ó Searcaigh, Homecoming/An Bealach 'na Bhaile, including "Bo Bhradach", "Na Piopai Creafoige", and "Caoineadh", Gaelic-language, Ireland
 Novica Tadić, Night Mail: Selected Poems, Macedonia
 Yu Jian, Dui yi zhi wuya de mingming, Chinese

Awards and honors

Australia
 C. J. Dennis Prize for Poetry: Les Murray, Translations from the Natural World
 Dinny O'Hearn Poetry Prize: At the Florida by John Tranter
 Kenneth Slessor Prize for Poetry: Les Murray, Translations from the Natural World
 Mary Gilmore Prize: Jill Jones - The Mask and Jagged Star

Canada
 Gerald Lampert Award: Elisabeth Harvor, Fortress of Chairs and Roberta Rees, Eyes Like Pigeons
 Archibald Lampman Award: Marianne Bluger, Summer Grass
 1993 Governor General's Awards: Don Coles, Forests of the Medieval World (English); Denise Desautels, Le Saut de l'ange
 Pat Lowther Award: Lorna Crozier, Inventing the Hawk
 Prix Alain-Grandbois: Anne Hébert, Le Jour n'a d'égal que la nuit
 Dorothy Livesay Poetry Prize: Bill Bissett, 
 Prix Émile-Nelligan: Martin-Pierre Tremblay, Le Plus Petit Désert

India
 Poetry Society India National Poetry Competition : Shampa Sinha for Siesta

United Kingdom
 Cholmondeley Award: Patricia Beer, George Mackay Brown, P. J. Kavanagh, Michael Longley
 Forward Poetry Prize Best Collection: Carol Ann Duffy, Mean Time (Anvil Press)
 Forward Poetry Prize Best First Collection: Don Paterson, Nil Nil (Faber and Faber)
 T. S. Eliot Prize (United Kingdom and Ireland): Ciaran Carson, First Language: Poems
 Whitbread Award for poetry: Carol Ann Duffy, Mean Time
 National Poetry Competition : Sam Gardiner for Protestant Windows

United States
 Agnes Lynch Starrett Poetry Prize: Natasha Sajé, Red Under the Skin
 Aiken Taylor Award for Modern American Poetry: George Starbuck
 AML Award for poetry to Linda Sillitoe for "Crazy Living"
 Bernard F. Connors Prize for Poetry: Stephen Yenser, "Blue Guide"
 Bollingen Prize (United States): Mark Strand
 Frost Medal: William Stafford
 National Book Award for poetry (United States): A.R. Ammons, Garbage (will also win 1994 Bobbitt National Prize for Poetry)
 Poet Laureate Consultant in Poetry to the Library of Congress: Rita Dove appointed
 Pulitzer Prize for poetry (United States):  Louise Glück, The Wild Iris
 Pulitzer Prize for Poetry: Louise Glück, The Wild Iris
 Ruth Lilly Poetry Prize: Charles Wright
 Whiting Awards: Mark Levine, Nathaniel Mackey, Dionisio D. Martinez, Kathleen Peirce
 Fellowship of the Academy of American Poets: Gerald Stern

Deaths
Birth years link to the corresponding "[year] in poetry" article:
 April 23 – Bertus Aafjes, 89 (born 1914), Dutch poet
 June 19 – William Golding, 82 (born 1919), English novelist, poet, and winner of the 1983 Nobel Prize for Literature
 June 22 – Jerry Estrin, 46 (born 1947 in poetry), American poet (Rome, A Mobile Home) and magazine editor (Vanishing Cab)
 August 28 – William Stafford, 79, American  poet and pacifist, and the father of poet and essayist Kim Stafford
 September 16 – Oodgeroo Noonuccal, 71, Australian poet, actress, writer, teacher, artist and campaigner for Aboriginal causes
 September 26 – Nina Berberova, Нина Николаевна Берберова (born 1901), Russian-born poet, novelist, playwright, critic and academic who lived in Europe from 1922 to 1950, then in the United States
 October 27 – Peter Quennell, 88, English biographer, historian and poet
 October (exact date not known) – Gu Cheng, Chinese poet, by suicide
 Exact date not known – Parijat, पारिजात, Bishnu Kumari Waiba, c.56 (born 1937), Nepalese novelist and poet

See also

Poetry
List of years in poetry
List of poetry awards

Notes

20th-century poetry
Poetry